Brønnøysund is a town and the administrative centre of Brønnøy Municipality in Nordland county, Norway.  It is also a former municipality within Nordland county.  The village of Brønnøysund originally was declared a ladested in 1923 which made it an independent municipality.  After merging with Brønnøy in 1964, it lost its town status.  Then in 2000, it once again received town status.  The town lies along the coast and is often called "the coastal town in the middle of Norway."  Brønnøysund is also the regional center of Southern Helgeland.

History 

During the Viking era, Torgar, by the foot of the legendary mountain Torghatten, was a nationally powerful chieftain seat and an important commercial center along the coast. The original inhabitants were wiped out in an outright massacre by Duke Skule and his men in the Norwegian civil wars that raged around 1240, in the high medieval era of Norway.

The region was re-populated by immigrants from Southern Norway, Trøndelag, and Sweden, which could explain the unique dialect with a Swedish-like intonation.

In May 1945 "the prisoners [foreign POWs] from Ylvingen" were transported by ship from the harbour at Brønnøysund. ("the song saved my life") documents the farewell to Igor Trapitsin and the other Soviet ex-POWs from the harbour at Brønnøysund.

Name
The town (and former municipality) is named Brønnøysund after the small island Brønnøya since it is located on the island. Islands with freshwater wells were important for seafarers.

Municipal history
The village of Brønnøysund was established as a municipality on 1 January 1923 when it was separated from Brønnøy Municipality when it became a ladested (town) and municipality of its own.  During the 1960s, there were many municipal mergers across Norway due to the work of the Schei Committee. On 1 January 1964, the town of Brønnøysund (population: 2,064) was merged with Velfjord Municipality (population: 1,380), Sømna Municipality (population: 2,347), Brønnøy Municipality (population: 2,635), and the Lande-Tosen area of Bindal Municipality to form a new, enlarged Brønnøy Municipality. At that time, it lost its status as a ladested (town).  In 2000, after some changes to Norwegian law, the municipality of Brønnøy designated Brønnøysund as a town once again.

Municipal council
The municipal council  of Brønnøysund was made up of representatives that were elected to four-year terms.  The party breakdown of the final municipal council was as follows:

Economy

The town is the administrative and commercial centre of the municipality of Brønnøy. 

In recent years, Brønnøysund has managed to create a certain economic growth. Fjord Seafood originated here, as well as the largest limestone mine in Northern Europe and the highest foodstuff production in Northern Norway are examples of entrepreneurship and well-run economy in this somewhat prosperous region. Modern agriculture, hydroponics, the large TTS transport corporation, wood processing and tourism are the main driving industries.

Transportation

Brønnøysund has daily visits by the Hurtigruten (Coastal Express), northbound at night and southbound in the afternoon.  It has its own airport, Brønnøysund Airport, Brønnøy, and a direct eastbound connection to the European route E6 highway.

Throughout Norway, the town is known as the location of the Brønnøysund Register Centre, in which the new e-government portal Altinn is the newest addition. Torghatten ASA has its headquarters in Brønnøysund.

Airport

The airport opened in 1968, providing modern and much needed, time-effective transportation to the region, and making it possible to reach both the capital and medical services within an acceptable timeframe.

In May 2010, the direct flight to Oslo was launched, and since April 2011 there are three daily departures for Oslo with a 50-seat plane. There are also connections to Sandnessjøen, Mo i Rana, Rørvik, Trondheim, and Bodø.

It is served by Norway's oldest airline, Widerøe. It is also base for some of the offshore helicopter services, making it possible to exploit the vast petroleum resources offshore.

Culture
The town has a number of cultural institutions:
 Brønnøysund Musikkorps (wind band)
 Brønnøysund Mannskor (male choir)
 Kor i Øyan (mixed choir)
The NRK series Himmelblå, a franchise of the British Two Thousand Acres of Sky, was filmed in part in Brønnøysund and on various locations nearby.  The local Brønnøy Church serves the town of Brønnøysund.

Geography

Brønnøysund sits on a narrow peninsula on the mainland surrounded by islands and water.  The town is connected to the island Torget by the Brønnøysund Bridge.

Climate
Brønnøysund has a temperate oceanic climate with mild winters (Koppen Cfb) considering the northerly location, and a long frost-free season. 9 of the 12 monthly all-time lows are from 1940 or older; 3 from before 1900. The all-time low  was recorded in February 1966, and the all-time high  was set on July 27th 2019.

In popular culture
The 2015 documentary film Sangen reddet mitt liv ("the song saved my life") documents the farewell to Igor Trapitsin and the other Soviet ex-POWs from the harbour at Brønnøysund.

See also
List of former municipalities of Norway

References

External links 
 bronnoysund.com - local portal for Brønnøysund and Brønnøy
 Brønnøysund Airport, Brønnøy
 Brønnøysund Airport - the first in the world to use satellite based landing guidance for passenger flights
 Brønnøysund Register Centre
 Images of the Brønnøysund Area, Dana Morris
 Images of the Brønnøysund Area, Armin Burkhart

Former municipalities of Norway
Populated places in Nordland
Cities and towns in Norway
Brønnøy
1923 establishments in Norway
1964 disestablishments in Norway